The 2003–04 season was Football Club Internazionale Milano's 95th in existence and 88th consecutive season in the top flight of Italian football.

Season overview
The 2003–04 season started with a lot of issues: despite assembling an expensive squad, Inter got poor results in the domestic league (two wins, three draws and a loss in derby) and Héctor Cúper was sacked. In order to replace him, Alberto Zaccheroni was appointed coach before eventually finishing fourth in the league. Inter's campaign in the Champions League, however, resulted in failure: they didn't manage to get past the group stage, despite a historical win over Arsenal (0-3 in Highbury).

In January 2004, Massimo Moratti decided to leave his position of chairman, to be replaced by former player Giacinto Facchetti, who remains as chairman until his death on 4 September 2006.

Players

Squad information

From youth squad

Transfers

Winter

Competitions

Overview

Serie A

League table

Results summary

Results by round

Matches

Coppa Italia

Round of 16

Quarter-finals

Semi-finals

UEFA Champions League

Group stage

UEFA Cup

Third round

Eightfinals

Quarter-finals

Statistics

Squad statistics
{|class="wikitable" style="text-align: center;"
|-
!
! style="width:70px;"|League
! style="width:70px;"|UCL
! style="width:70px;"|CU
! style="width:70px;"|Cup
! style="width:70px;"|Total Stats
|-
|align=left|Games played       || 38 || 6 || 6 || 6 || 56
|-
|align=left|Games won          || 17 || 2 || 1 || 2 || 22
|-
|align=left|Games drawn        || 8  || 2 || 3 || 4 || 17
|-
|align=left|Games lost         || 9  || 2 || 2 || 0 || 13
|-
|align=left|Goals scored       || 59 || 8 || 6 ||10 || 83 
|-
|align=left|Goals conceded     || 37 ||11 || 7 || 6 || 61
|-
|align=left|Goal difference    || 22 ||-3 ||-1 || 4 || 22
|-
|align=left|Clean sheets       || 15 || 1 || 2 || 1 || 19
|-
|align=left|Goal by substitute || – || – || – || – || –
|-
|align=left|Total shots        || – || – || – || – || –
|-
|align=left|Shots on target    || – || – || – || – || –
|-
|align=left|Corners            || – || – || – || – || –
|-
|align=left|Players used       || 29 || 22 || 23 || 28 ||
|-
|align=left|Offsides           || – || – || – || – || –
|-
|align=left|Fouls suffered     || – || – || – || – || –
|-
|align=left|Fouls committed    || – || – || – || – || –
|-
|align=left|Yellow cards       || 56 || 9 || 6 || 0 || 71
|-
|align=left|Red cards          || 4 || 0 || 1 || 2 || 7
|-

Appearances and goals
As of 16 May 2004

Goalscorers

Notes

References

External links
Official website

Inter Milan seasons
Internazionale